Snake Creek (sometimes known as Big Snake Creek) is a  tributary of the Susquehanna River flowing from the Mouth of Lake Montrose in Montrose, Susquehanna County, Pennsylvania, and Broome County, New York, in the United States.

Snake Creek joins the Susquehanna at Corbettsville, New York.  There is a much smaller stream known as Little Snake Creek, which joins the Susquehanna north of (downstream of) Snake Creek.

In the early 19th century, Snake Creek was the site of a sawmill run by Cooper Corbett.

See also
List of rivers of New York
List of rivers of Pennsylvania

References

Defebaugh, James Elliott. History of the lumber industry in America, The American lumberman, 1907.

Rivers of New York (state)
Rivers of Pennsylvania
Rivers of Susquehanna County, Pennsylvania
Tributaries of the Susquehanna River
Rivers of Broome County, New York